Remberto Giménez was a Paraguayan musician. He was born in Coronel Oviedo, Paraguay the February 4 of  1898 as a son of Ciriaco Giménez and Ana Bella Benítez.

Beginnings

As he concluded his military service he studied singing and violin theory with Vicente Maccarone, in the Paraguayan Institute.

His Trajectory

Charges Occupied regarding Art

He was a restless musical event organizer ad participated of countless cultural events. He was member of the Academy of  Language and Guaraní Culture. Remberto was one of the main supporters of the union between the Paraguayan Institute and Gymnasium, fusion of which emerged the Paraguayan Association.  He was the first president of  A.P.A. (Associated Paraguayan Authors). He was a teacher in the National School of the Capital and in the School of Girls of Asuncion. Also he was general music director “ad honorem”

In the educational field, he was part of the formation of choirs and wrote popular music arrangements, also writing some songs dedicated to the youths. Several brilliant violinists and pianists emerged from the Normal School of  Music. The fact that Remberto never entirely shared his knowledge about composition is criticized and is the probable reason for not leaving disciples. Other intriguing fact is that he never invited other orchestra director to direct his (OSCA).

He was a great orchestra director and in some of his pieces as in “Paraguayan Rhapsody” a superior harmonic display can be noticed in comparison to other Paraguayan composers in the time. He was likewise a great violinist.
 
As a creator his symphonic pieces remain in a nationalist and romantic style as other pieces share a limited style of popular pieces of good taste.  He directed and published various editions of his arrangements and anthems just as the different versions for the national anthem.  He published two discs with the (OSCA) sponsored by the Municipality of Asunción.

Compositions

His pieces belong to a nationalist and romantic style.

In his pieces: “Campanento Cerro León”, “La Golondrina”, “Nostalgias del terruño”, “Ka´aguy Ryakua” (Fragrance of the forest) and “Kuarahy oike jave” (When the sun sets), “la Marcha presidential” and numerous arrangements for symphonic orchestra.

He is author of various pieces for violin and piano.

Amongst his songs: “Himno a la juventud”, “Canción de paz”, “Al pie de tu reja y Conscripto”, “Himno del Colegio Nacional de la Capital” and “Armonía”.

Last Years 

He married Silvia Fiandro, with whom he had children.

He died the February 15 of 1977 in Asunción.

References
 Centro Cultural de la República
 Diccionario Biográfico "FORJADORES DEL PARAGUAY", Primera Edición Enero de 2000. Distribuidora Quevedo de Ediciones. Buenos Aires, Argentina.

External links
Música Paraguaya

1898 births
1977 deaths
People from Coronel Oviedo
Paraguayan musicians
National anthem writers